Juan José Wedel (28 June 1944 – 20 November 2013) was a Costa Rican archer. He competed in the men's individual event at the 1976 Summer Olympics, and at the 1980 Summer Olympics.

References

1944 births
2013 deaths
Costa Rican male archers
Olympic archers of Costa Rica
Archers at the 1976 Summer Olympics
Archers at the 1980 Summer Olympics
Sportspeople from San José, Costa Rica